Midnight Whispers (Chinese: 盡訴心中情; Pinyin: Jin su xin zhong qing; Jyutping: Jun so sam jung ching; literally Cascading Feeling) is a 1986 Hong Kong melodramatic film starring Josephine Koo and Moon Lee. The film reportedly sat on the shelf for over a year before finally being released in 1988.

Alternate versions
This film has at least two version in every of its release:

In the original theatrical release and first video release available in Hong Kong during the late 1980s-early 1990s, there were scenes involving real life radio personality Pamela Peck who plays herself as the host of a popular late-night radio call-in program.
In the DVD edition, any scenes with real life radio personality Pamela Peck present in the theatrical version were absences and replaced with an alternate cut.

External links

 
 Midnight Whispers at HKMDB.com
 Midnight Whispers at Hong Kong Cinemagic

1986 films
1980s Cantonese-language films
Hong Kong drama films
1980s Hong Kong films